Double Decker is a 2011 Kannada comedy film starring Jaggesh,Shraddha Arya and Siya Gautham. The film has been directed and written by director Victory Vasu and produced by Sreenivas . Jayapaul has composed the soundtrack and  the background score. The film was released on 22 April 2011. The film is a remake of Govinda and Raveena Tandon starrer Hindi film, Sandwich.

Cast
 Jaggesh as Paramesh 
 Shraddha Arya as Parvathi
 Siya Gautham as Ganga
 Tennis Krishna as Film director

Soundtrack

Reception

Critical response 

A critic from The Times of India scored the film at 3.5 out of 5 stars and says "The rest is for the audience to enjoy. Shradha Arya and Siya Gautham have excelled in their roles. Tennis Krishna does a good job as a film director. Music by Purandar Jaipal and camera by P K H Das impress". B S Srivani from Deccan Herald wrote "Purandar Jaipal’s music is a pleasant surprise while PKH Das is his usual self. Prakash’s crisp editing cuts out superfluous stuff, leaving the viewers to enjoy this desi sandwich. Double Decker with its double entendres is a definite time pass on a muggy afternoon". A critic from NDTV wrote "Veteran actors Avinash, Shobharaj, Chandrashekhar have performed their roles with ease. P.K.H. Doss' camera work is really good, but the other technical aspects of the movie are just ordinary".

References

2010s Kannada-language films
Kannada remakes of Hindi films